This article displays the qualifying draw of the 2011 Sony Ericsson Open.

Players

Seeds

Qualifiers

Qualifying draw

First qualifier

Second qualifier

Third qualifier

Fourth qualifier

Fifth qualifier

Sixth qualifier

Seventh qualifier

Eighth qualifier

Ninth qualifier

Tenth qualifier

Eleventh qualifier

Twelfth qualifier

References
 Qualifying Draw

2011 Sony Ericsson Open
Sony Ericsson Open - qualifying
Women in Florida
Qualification for tennis tournaments